Port Moody—Coquitlam (formerly known as Port Moody—Coquitlam—Port Coquitlam) is a federal electoral district in British Columbia, Canada, that was represented in the House of Commons of Canada from 1997 to 2004 and since 2015.

Geography

It initially consisted of:
 the eastern part of Electoral Area B of the Greater Vancouver Regional District but excluding Croker Island, Douglas Island and Barnston Island;
 the City of Port Moody;
 the part of Coquitlam District Municipality lying west of the Coquitlam River and the north and west boundaries of the City of Port Coquitlam;
 the part of the City of Port Coquitlam lying south and west of the Canadian Pacific Railway right-of-way; and
 the Village of Belcarra.

In 1996, it was redefined to consist of the part of Greater Vancouver Regional District lying north and east of a line drawn from the intersection of the northern limit of Greater Vancouver Regional District with the Indian River; south along the Indian River and Indian Arm to the limit of the City of Burnaby, east and south along the northern and eastern limits of Burnaby, east along the southern limit of the City of Port Moody, south along Gatensbury Road, east along Foster Avenue, south along Hillcrest Street, east along Austin Avenue, south along Mundy Street, east along the Trans-Canada Highway (Highway No. 1); thence easterly along the Trans-Canada Highway, south along Leeder Avenue, east along the southern limit of the cities of Coquitlam and Port Coquitlam to the eastern limit of the GVRD.

History
This riding was created in 1987 as "Port Moody—Coquitlam" from parts of Mission—Port Moody and New Westminster—Coquitlam ridings.

The name of the district was changed in 1998 to "Port Moody—Coquitlam—Port Coquitlam".

In 2003, the district was abolished. A small portion was given to New Westminster—Coquitlam while the remainder was moved into the new Port Moody—Westwood—Port Coquitlam riding.

The 2012 electoral redistribution saw this riding resurrected for the 2015 election, taking in territories currently in New Westminster—Coquitlam and Port Moody—Westwood—Port Coquitlam.

Demographics

Members of Parliament
This riding elected the following Members of Parliament:

Election results

Port Moody—Coquitlam, 2015–present

Port Moody—Coquitlam—Port Coquitlam, 2000–2004

Port Moody—Coquitlam, 1988–2000

See also 

 List of Canadian federal electoral districts
 Past Canadian electoral districts

Notes

References

External links 
 Port Moody—Coquitlam Library of Parliament Riding Profile
 Port Moody—Coquitlam—Port Coquitlam Library of Parliament Riding Profile
 Expenditures - 2000
 Expenditures – 1997
 Website of the Parliament of Canada

British Columbia federal electoral districts
Federal electoral districts in Greater Vancouver and the Fraser Valley
Politics of Coquitlam
Port Moody